Joseph Ansah Ekuban (born 2 January 2000) is a Ghanaian football player. He plays for Italian  club Fidelis Andria on loan from Virtus Francavilla.

Club career

Verona
He was raised in the youth teams of Verona. He never was called up to the senior squad. He spent 2018–19 season in Serie D with Mantova.

Loan to Partizani
On 12 July 2019 he joined Albanian Superliga club Partizani Tirana on loan with an option to buy.

He made his first appearances for Partizani in July in their European (UEFA Champions League and UEFA Europa League) qualifiers matches against Qarabağ and Sheriff Tiraspol.

He made his professional Albanian Superliga debut for Partizani on 15 September 2019 in a game against Laçi. He substituted Jasir Asani in the 57th minute. On 20 January 2020, Partizani announced that they are terminating the loan early. He made just one appearance in the Albanian Superliga, two in Albanian Cup and two in UEFA qualifiers.

Virtus Francavilla
On 21 January 2020, he signed a 2.5-year contract with Serie C club Virtus Francavilla.

Loan to Monterosi
On 20 January 2022, he was loaned to Monterosi.

Loan to Fidelis Andria
On 6 January 2023, Ekuban moved on loan to Fidelis Andria.

Personal life
His older brother Caleb Ekuban is also a football player. He scored 17 goals for Partizani in the 2016–17 season, 2 years prior to Joseph joining the club.

References

External links
 

2000 births
Living people
Ghanaian footballers
Association football forwards
Mantova 1911 players
FK Partizani Tirana players
Virtus Francavilla Calcio players
Monterosi Tuscia F.C. players
S.S. Fidelis Andria 1928 players
Serie C players
Serie D players
Kategoria Superiore players
Ghanaian expatriate footballers
Expatriate footballers in Italy
Ghanaian expatriate sportspeople in Italy
Expatriate footballers in Albania
Ghanaian expatriate sportspeople in Albania